Rice bread is a type of bread that is made from rice flour rather than wheat flour. Being gluten free, it will not cause adverse reactions for people with gluten intolerance.

The Vietnamese banh mi (baguette) is traditionally made with a mixture of wheat and rice flour, or sometimes exclusively the latter, resulting in an airy, crispy texture.

Liberian rice bread is traditionally made with rice flour, mashed ripe plantains, butter, eggs, baking soda, sugar, salt, water, and grated ginger.

In 2001, a study group at Yamagata University's Department of Engineering used foam molding technology to produce bread made from 100% rice flour.

References

Rice dishes

Breads